The Bogue River is a small river that crosses the municipalities of Weedon and Dudswell, Quebec, in the Le Haut-Saint-François Regional County Municipality (MRC), the administrative region of Estrie, in Quebec, in Canada.

Geography 

The neighboring hydrographic slopes of the Bogue River are:
 north side: Paré stream, rivière Nicolet Centre;
 east side: Paré stream, Saint-François River;
 south side: Saint-François River;
 west side: outlet of Lac d'Argent, Nicolet River.

The unnamed small lake is the source of the Bogue River. It is located in the western part of the municipality of Weedon, west of Weeland Lake, south of "Lac Fer à Cheval" and west of "Montagne d'Adjutor".

  southwesterly, to the municipal boundary between Weedon and Dudswell;
  southwesterly, to the foot of the southeastern slope of "Montagne d'Adjutor" located in the municipality of Dudswell;
  south-east, up to route 112;
  south to the road;
  eastward, to its mouth.

Toponymy 
The toponym "rivière de la Bogue" was made official on November 7, 1985, at the Commission de toponymie du Québec.

See also 

 List of rivers of Quebec

References 

Rivers of Estrie
Le Haut-Saint-François Regional County Municipality